Koiak 19 - Coptic Calendar - Koiak 21

The twenties day of the Coptic month of Koiak, the fourth month of the Coptic year. On a common year, this day corresponds to December 16, of the Julian Calendar, and December 29, of the Gregorian Calendar. This day falls in the Coptic season of Peret, the season of emergence. This day falls in the Nativity Fast.

Commemorations

Saints 

 The departure of the Righteous Haggai the Prophet 
 The martyrdom of Saint Elias, the Bishop of Al-Muharraq Monastery and Al-Qosiah

References 

Days of the Coptic calendar